In complex analysis, the Blaschke product is a bounded analytic function in the open unit disc constructed to have zeros at a (finite or infinite) sequence of prescribed complex numbers

a0, a1, ...

inside the unit disc, with the property that the magnitude of the function is constant along the boundary of the disc.

They are related to  Hardy spaces.

Definition

A sequence of points  inside the unit disk is said to satisfy the Blaschke condition when

Given a sequence obeying the Blaschke condition, the Blaschke product is defined as

with factors

provided a ≠ 0. Here  is the complex conjugate of a. When a = 0 take B(0,z) = z.

The Blaschke product B(z) defines a function analytic in the open unit disc, and zero exactly at the an (with multiplicity counted): furthermore it is in the Hardy class .

The sequence of an satisfying the convergence criterion above is sometimes called a Blaschke sequence.

Szegő theorem

Finite Blaschke products

Finite Blaschke products can be characterized (as analytic functions on the unit disc) in the following way: Assume that f is an analytic function on the open unit disc such that 
f can be extended to a continuous function on the closed unit disc

 
that maps the unit circle to itself.  Then "f" is equal to a finite Blaschke product

where ζ lies on the unit circle and mi is the multiplicity of the zero ai, |ai| < 1. In particular, if f satisfies the  condition above and has no zeros inside the unit circle, then f is constant (this fact is also a consequence of the maximum principle for harmonic functions, applied to the harmonic function log(|f(z)|)).

See also
 Hardy space
 Weierstrass product

References

 W. Blaschke,  Eine Erweiterung des Satzes von Vitali über Folgen analytischer Funktionen  Berichte Math.-Phys. Kl., Sächs. Gesell. der Wiss. Leipzig, 67  (1915)  pp. 194–200
 Peter Colwell, Blaschke Products — Bounded Analytic Functions (1985), University of Michigan Press, Ann Arbor, 140 pages. 
 

Complex analysis